The Copenhagen City Council is the municipal government of Copenhagen, Denmark, and has its seat at Copenhagen City Hall. 

The city council is Copenhagen's highest political authority and sets the framework for the committees' tasks. The City of Copenhagen's government consists of an economic committee and six standing committees, each working in its own field. 

The city council has 55 members (abbreviated MBs), and is chaired by the lord mayor, who chairs the Economic Affairs Committee. The chairpersons of the six standing committees have the title of mayor. The lord mayor, together with the six mayors and six members of the city council, make up the Economic Affairs Committee. Unlike other Danish municipalities, the City of Copenhagen does not have deputy mayors, but a first and second vice-chair of the city council.

History 
The forerunner of the Copenhagen City Council, the Council of 32 Men, was established in 1660. The assembly primarily consisted of high-ranking citizens. In 1840, the city council was established by royal decree, consisting of 36 democratically elected members. This number was increased to 42 members in 1903. Later, in 1913, the city council was expanded to 55 members.

Committees 
The seven committees are:

 Economic Affairs committee (Lord Mayor Sophie Hæstorp Andersen, Social Democrats)
 Culture and Leisure Committee (Mayor , Social Liberal Party)
 Technical and Environmental Committee (Mayor Line Barfod, Red–Green Alliance)
 Children and Youth Committee (Mayor Jakob Næsager, The Conservative People's Party)
 Social Affairs Committee (Mayor Karina Vestergård Madsen, Red–Green Alliance)
 Health and Care Committee (Mayor , Socialist People's Party)
 Employment and Integration Committee (Mayor Cecilia Lonning-Skovgaard, Venstre)

Composition of the city council 
Below are the municipal councils elected since 1909.

City council chairs 

 1840–1840 
 1841–1853 Lauritz Nicolai Hvidt (National Liberal Party)
 1853–1858 Hans Peter Hansen (again)
 1858–1860 
 1860–1863  (National Liberal Party)
 1863–1873  (Højre [1848 party])
 1873–1883  (Højre [1881 party])
 1883–1885  (again) (Højre)
 1885–1895 Peter Frederik Koch (Højre)
 1895–1898  (Højre)
 1898–1907 Herman Trier (from 1905: Danish Social Liberal Party)
 1907–1909  (independent)
 1909–1910  (Social Democrats)
 1910–1912 
 1912–1913  (again)
 1913–1917  (Social Democrats)
 1917–1919 Anthon Andersen (Social Democrats)
 1919–1924 Thorvald Stauning (Social Democrats)
 1924–1925  (Social Democrats)
 1925–1926  (Social Democrats)
 1926–1937  (Social Democrats)
 1937–1938 Julius C. Hansen (Social Democrats)
 1938–1942  (Social Democrats)
 1942–1946  (Social Democrats)
 1946–1962  (Social Democrats)
 1962–1970  (Social Democrats)
 1970–1976 Egon Weidekamp (Social Democrats)
 1976–1981  (Social Democrats)
 1982–1986  (Social Democrats)
 1986–1989  (The Conservative People's Party)
 1990–1993  (Socialist People's Party)
 1994–1997  (Social Democrats)
Since 1998, the incumbent mayor has been the permanent chair of the city council.

See also 
List of lord mayors of Copenhagen

References

External links 
 Københavns Borgerrepræsentation – the official website 
 City Hall Library: City Council – overview of all mayors and members of the Copenhagen City Council 

1840 establishments
Copenhagen Municipality